Saratov South was a former air base in Russia located 8 km southwest of Saratov.  And was a military airfield during the Cold War with 17 parking stands and tarmac space.  It later served as a Yakovlev factory airfield.

Google Earth high-resolution imagery from the 2004-2005 time-frame showed one Yak-42 and a couple of general aviation propeller planes, indicating the airfield remained operational.  However, imagery from late-2017 showed the runway and stands being de-constructed and multi-storied buildings under construction near the former apron areas.

References
RussianAirFields.com

Soviet Air Force bases
Airports built in the Soviet Union
Airports in Saratov Oblast